Daeheungsa, sometimes called Daedunsa, is a main temple of the Jogye Order of Korean Buddhism.  Daeheungsa is located on the slopes of Duryunsan (Duryun Mountain) in Samsan Township, Haenam County, in the province of Jeollanam-do near the southern limit of South Korea.

Origins
Daeheungsa is believed to date to the Three Kingdoms period (4th-9th centuries CE), although no exact record of its founding has survived some think Daeheungsa was founded by Adohwasang (Monk) in 514.

Originally this temple was called Handeumjeol, after the mountain's original name, Mount Handeum. Chinese characters were eventually used, which caused it to be called Daedum, and from there the name changed again to Daeheungsa. The mountain's name was later changed to Mount Duryun.

Daeheungsa received little attention until 1592 when Seosan Daesa (monk) organized and trained a guerilla army of 5,000 monks at the temple, to help defend the Korean people during the Imjin War(Japanese invasions).

Treasures

Cultural Properties #48

Daeheungsabungmireugammaaeyeoraejwasang (North rock-cut seated Maitreya Buddha of Daeheung Temple) is a rock cliff Buddha carved out of a large natural wall of rock, believed to date from the early years of the Goryeo Dynasty (918-1392), based on the overall sculpture style and by the way the lower part of the body is out of proportion with the larger upper part.

The mudra, or symbolic hand gesture, is that of expelling devils. The robe is tied on the left shoulder which is rather uncommon. One distinctive feature of this Buddha statue is the beobeui (sacerdotal robe), typical of this era. The hands look weak and the form of the legs is very awkward.

Treasure #320

Three Storied Stone Pagoda of Daeheungsa is a 4.3 meter/14.1 foot high stone pagoda typical of the Silla Dynasty period that stands in front of Eungjinjeon (hall).  This pagoda is very neat and elegant in its construction.

Treasure #1347

Stupa of Seosan Dasae of Daeheungasa is the reliquary for preserving the sarira (pearl or crystal-like bead-shaped objects that are purportedly found among the cremated ashes of Buddhist spiritual masters) of the monk Seosan Dasae.  He is renowned as the monk who lead an army that defeated invading Japanese forces.  This 2.6 meter/8.5 foot high stupa is believed to have been erected in 1648.

Features

Daeheungsa is very famous for the long walkway to the entrance which wanders through a beautiful forest at the foot of Duryun Mountain.

Inside Cheonbuljeon (Thousand Buddha Hall) can be seen 1,000 smiling Buddha statues. The tiny Buddhas represent the Buddha that is omnipresent any time in the past, present, and future as well as that anyone can be a Buddha anytime anyplace.  Records indicate that Cheonbuljeon burned down in 1811 and was rebuilt in 1813.

The temple is known as a historical center of Korean tea culture.

Gallery

See also
Korean Buddhist temples
Religion in South Korea

References

External links

Official site
KoreaTemple profile

Buddhist temples in South Korea
Haenam County
Buddhist temples of the Jogye Order
Buildings and structures in South Jeolla Province
World Heritage Sites in South Korea